Alziro Bergonzo (30 December 1906 – 22 May 1997) was an Italian architect and painter. His primary style was the rationalized Stile Littorio.

He was the son of Luigi Bergonzo, an engineering graduate from Bern who had moved to Bergamo in the early 1900s. His studies were interrupted by military service, but he graduated in 1933.

He worked in his father's established studio, which helped him get to know directly other renowned professionals and artists in the field of decoration. The quality of his early work was noted and he began to receive commissions from various public and private clients, most often in Bergamo.

When World War II broke out, he moved his studio to Rome, where he participated in the competition of the EU42 and collaborated with Luigi Moretti for the Foro Italico.

After the war, he was purged from the professional register for political reasons, but in 1946 he was reinstated and won a competition for the Lido di Venezia. Bergonzo's post-war work includes the Casa Trussardi in Bergammo, the Teatro Manzoni in Milan, port works in Saudi Arabia, and a theatre in Cairo. He also designed the fourth City Gate of Valletta, Malta in the mid-1960s.

After designing many public works, Bergonzo began to reserve his projects for private clients, at the same time devoting some of his time to painting, especially in the last few years of his life. He died in Milan in 1997, shortly after the opening of his last major work, the new Piazza della Libertà in Bergamo.

Works

 Hotel Franceschetti, passo Presolana (1929)
 Casa Pellegrini, Bergamo (1932–33)
 Casa del Balilla, Bergamo (1932)
 Colonia elioterapica, Palazzolo sull'Oglio (1935–36)
 Casa del Fascio, Caravaggio (1935–37)
 Casa del'Opera Nazionale Balilla (now Auditorium Modernissimo), Nembro (1936)
 Casa Littoria (now Casa della Libertà), Bergamo (1937–40)
 Municipio, Palazzo Italo Balbo, Nembro (1940)
 , casello autostradale di Bergamo (1940–41)
 Casa Trussardi, Bergamo alta (1945)
 , Milan (1946–50)
 Palazzo dei congressi, Stresa (1956–57)
 Reggiani divisione tessile factory (extension), Bergamo (1957–66)
 Chiesa dei Tre Martiri, Rimini
 Fourth City Gate, Valletta, Malta (1964–65)

References

1906 births
1997 deaths
20th-century Italian architects
20th-century Italian painters
Architects from Lombardy
Painters from Bergamo
Polytechnic University of Milan alumni